YLC-6 is a series of two-dimensional radars from Nanjing Research Institute of Electronics Technology (NRIET) for mobile and static medium- and low-altitude surveillance.

Specifications
 S-band
 Coverage (¦Ò= 2m2, Pd=0.8, Pf=10-6)
 Range: <150 km
 Elevation: 0¡«40¡ã
 Height: 10,000 m
 Mobility:
 Set-up time: 8 min.
 Tear-down time: 6 min.
 Other features
 Fully coherent solid state transmitter
 Low side-lobe antenna
 Dual-channel receiver (redundancy backup)
Digital signal processor
 Automatic hydraulic leveling, automatic north alignment & GPS

Exports

External links
NRIET

References

 Janes Radar and Electronic Warfare 2006-2007 Edition, 

Ground radars
Military radars of the People's Republic of China